The Edward Dodge House is a historic house located at 126 East Grand Avenue in Port Washington, Wisconsin.

Description and history 
The two-story house was built by Edward Dodge in 1848, in the Greek Revival style with walls of rubble-stone faced with cobblestone arranged in colored bands, and also a pitched roof typical for houses built in that particular style. Currently, it serves as the Visitor's Center for the city of Port Washington.

It was added to the National Register of Historic Places on July 24, 1975.

References

Houses in Ozaukee County, Wisconsin
Cobblestone architecture
Houses completed in 1848
Houses on the National Register of Historic Places in Wisconsin
National Register of Historic Places in Ozaukee County, Wisconsin
Greek Revival houses in Wisconsin